Rachel Kapelke-Dale is an American author best known for her memoir, Graduates in Wonderland (Gotham, Penguin Group USA). She is from Milwaukee, Wisconsin and received a Bachelor of Arts in Art History from Brown University. Her co-author is Jessica Pan. She studied at the Sorbonne, a time of her life which is detailed in Graduates in Wonderland. She has written for Vanity Fair, Refinery29 and the Huffington Post. She currently lives in London.

Education
Kapelke-Dale has Bachelor of Arts from Brown University (2007) and a Master's from the Université de Paris VII (2011). She is currently a Ph.D. candidate in Film Studies in the Centre for Multidisciplinary and Intercultural Inquiry, University College London (UCL).

References

American memoirists
Living people
Year of birth missing (living people)
Writers from Milwaukee
Brown University alumni
American women memoirists
21st-century American women